The 1000 meters distance for women in the 2016–17 ISU Speed Skating World Cup will be contested over 7 races on six occasions, out of a total of World Cup occasions for the season, with the first occasion taking place in Harbin, China, on 11–13 November 2016, and the final occasion taking place in Stavanger, Norway, on 11–12 March 2017.

Heather Bergsma of the United States is crowned as World Cup champion by winning 6 of 7 World Cup races. She did not take part in third round of the World Cup in Astana.

Top three

Race medallists

Standings

References 

Women 1000
ISU